Lawn bowls at the 2022 Commonwealth Games – Women's singles was held at the Victoria Park   from July 29 to August 1. A total of 18 athletes from 18 associations participated in the event.

Sectional play
The top two from each section advance to the knockout stage.

Section A

Section B

Section C

Section D

Knockout stage

External links
Results

References

Women's singles